Titilayo Fatima Azeez (born 31 December 1992) is a Nigerian badminton player. In 2010, she competed at the Summer Youth Olympics in Singapore. In 2011, she won the women's doubles bronze medal at the All-Africa Games in Maputo, Mozambique.

Achievements

All-Africa Games 
Women's doubles

African Championships 
Women's singles

Women's doubles

BWF International Challenge/Series 
Women's singles

Women's doubles

 BWF International Challenge tournament
 BWF International Series tournament
 BWF Future Series tournament

References

External links
 

1992 births
Living people
Nigerian female badminton players
Badminton players at the 2010 Summer Youth Olympics
Competitors at the 2011 All-Africa Games
African Games gold medalists for Nigeria
African Games bronze medalists for Nigeria
African Games medalists in badminton
21st-century Nigerian women